Ocean Group may refer to:

Ocean Group International, holding company
Ocean Group plc, former British transport company
Ocean Productions, Canadian media company